Makhdoom Syed Murtaza Mehmoodis a Pakistani politician who has been a member of the National Assembly of Pakistan since August 2018. Previously he was a Member of the Provincial Assembly of the Punjab, from May 2013 to May 2018. He was sworn in as the Federal Minister for Industries in the coalition government of Shahbaz Sharif on the 19th of April 2022.

Early life and education
He was born on 19 April 1985.

He has the degree of Bachelor of Arts (Hons) in Economics.

Political career

He was elected to the Provincial Assembly of the Punjab as a candidate of Pakistan Peoples Party (PPP) from Constituency PP-295 (Rahimyar Khan-XI) in 2013 Pakistani general election.

He was elected to the National Assembly of Pakistan as a candidate of PPP from Constituency NA-180 (Rahim Yar Khan-VI) in 2018 Pakistani general election.

External Link

More Reading
 List of members of the 15th National Assembly of Pakistan
 List of Pakistan Tehreek-e-Insaf elected members (2013–2018)
 No-confidence motion against Imran Khan

References

Living people
Punjab MPAs 2013–2018
1985 births
Pakistan People's Party MPAs (Punjab)
Pakistani MNAs 2018–2023